John Hampson may refer to:

John Hampson (writer) (1760–1819), English religious writer
Jack Hampson (1887–1960), Welsh footballer
John Hampson (novelist) (1901–1955), English novelist
John Hampson (musician), American guitarist and vocalist, member of rock band Nine Days
John Hampson (artist) (1836–1923), artist who created bug art in Vermont